La Caridad Mine is a large open-pit copper mine in Nacozari, Sonora, Mexico. It is operated by Mexicana de Cobre, S.A.,  which is a part of Grupo Mexico, the largest copper producer in Mexico.

Although the mine was worked in the 1800s, it was closed about 1948, and did not reopen until 1979.

In 1985 the mine was producing over 72,000 metric tons of ore per day. In addition to copper, it produced silver as a byproduct, in 1995 that amounted to over 77 tons of silver. The mine was repurchased by investors from the Mexican government in 1988. The mine employed approximately 3,000 workers in 2000. In 2006 the mine was shut down due to labor strikes.

See also
 Buenavista mine

References

External links
La Caridad Mine at Mindat.org

Copper mines in Mexico
Surface mines in Mexico